Toa Payoh Stadium is a multi-purpose stadium in Toa Payoh, Singapore.

It is currently used mostly for football matches and is the home stadium of Balestier Khalsa FC.

The stadium holds 3,896 people. It was taken over by the then Singapore Sports Council on 30 November 1973, and opened to the public on 1 March 1974.

Facility
The stadium has a total seating capacity of 3,964 people. The stadium consists of a soccer field, an 8-lane running track and a fitness corner.

See also
List of stadiums in Singapore

References 

Sports venues in Singapore
Football venues in Singapore
Toa Payoh
Multi-purpose stadiums in Singapore
Singapore Premier League venues
Balestier Khalsa FC
1974 establishments in Singapore